Mark Mardell (born 10 September 1957, Hillingdon, Middlesex, England) is a British journalist, formerly the presenter of The World This Weekend on BBC Radio 4. He had previously served as BBC News's Europe editor, and provided coverage for each United Kingdom general election between 1992 and 2005, before he became North America editor.

Early life
Mardell was raised in Surrey and, like Nicholas Witchell, his near-contemporary in BBC News, attended Epsom College. At the University of Kent he studied Politics.

Career 
Mardell began his career reporting and reading the news for commercial station Radio Tees. He then worked at Radio Aire in Leeds before moving to Independent Radio News in London, where he became industrial editor covering the miners' strike and then the Wapping print dispute. He first appeared on television on Channel 4's The Sharp End. He joined the BBC in 1989 as political correspondent for the BBC Six O'Clock News.

From 1992 to 2000, Mardell worked as political editor for BBC Two's Newsnight programme. During this time he covered many political stories, including the fall of John Major's government and the rise of Tony Blair and New Labour. He returned to the Six O'Clock News, before becoming chief political correspondent and moving to the BBC Ten O'Clock News in 2003. Two years later he became the BBC's first Europe editor, covering the impact of European Union laws on people in and beyond the EU, from illegal immigration in Poland to environmental change in Spain.

Mardell regularly presented Broadcasting House and The World at One on BBC Radio 4, and presented a humorous review on This Week, BBC One's political chat show. He left his post as Europe editor to replace Justin Webb as BBC North America editor when Webb became a presenter on Radio 4's Today programme. At the end of April 2014, it emerged that Mardell was to leave his post in North America and become a presenter on BBC Radio 4, hosting The World This Weekend and the Friday edition of The World at One. 

During his last World at One broadcast on 30 October 2020, Mardell announced his surprise departure from the BBC after 30 years, which he had stated from his Twitter account with a tweet to his followers. In a later interview to Feedback Mardell explained to presenter Roger Bolton that his voice and mobility had changed following diagnosis of Parkinson's disease, Bolton seem to make light of the scoop and focussed on the number of "outstanding journalists" who had left BBC News ahead of budget cuts combined with the forthcoming limit on redundancy payments. 

On BBC's R4 Today programme, broadcast on the 3 October 2022, Mardell spoke freely of his illness, with presenter Nick Robinson and highlighted that presenter Jeremy Paxman had also been diagnosed with Parkinson's disease

References

External links
 Mark's blog on the BBC News website
 BBC Newswatch profile

1957 births
Living people
People educated at Epsom College
Alumni of the University of Kent
BBC newsreaders and journalists